Marieta Ilieva (born 13 December 1955) is a Bulgarian gymnast. She competed at the 1972 Summer Olympics.

References

External links
 

1955 births
Living people
Bulgarian female artistic gymnasts
Olympic gymnasts of Bulgaria
Gymnasts at the 1972 Summer Olympics
Sportspeople from Stara Zagora